John James Sitarsky (February 7, 1912 – November 2, 1956) was an American football, basketball, and baseball player and coach. He served as the head football coach at Bucknell University in 1943. He also served as the schools head baseball coach from 1938 to 1943.

Sitarsky was the starting quarterback for the 1935 Bucknell Bison football team defeated the Miami Hurricanes in the first ever Orange Bowl.

He died of a heart attack, aged 44.

Head coaching record

Football

References

External links
 Bucknell Athletics Hall of Fame profile

1912 births
1956 deaths
American football quarterbacks
Bucknell Bison baseball coaches
Bucknell Bison baseball players
Bucknell Bison football coaches
Bucknell Bison football players
Bucknell Bison men's basketball coaches
Bucknell Bison men's basketball players
American men's basketball players